Grouvellinus duplaris is a beetle species from the riffle beetle family. The scientific name of the species was published in 1923 by Champion. It is endemic to India.

References 

Beetles described in 1923
Insects of India
Elmidae